The New York State Commission of Correction is "empowered to visit and inspect all penal institutions and to promote humane and efficient administration of these institutions." It's a part of the New York State Executive Department.

History
It was created by the New York State Constitution and was then known as the State Commission of Prisons. It had eight commissioners appointed by the Governor of New York.

References

External links
 State Commission of Correction in the New York Codes, Rules and Regulations

State agencies of New York (state)
1894 establishments in New York (state)
Government agencies established in 1894